Nicolas Viton de Saint-Allais (1773 – 1842) was a French genealogist and littérateur.

Biography

Early life
Nicolas Viton de Saint-Allais was born on 6 April 1773 in Langres, France.

Career
During the French Revolution, he served as an Assistant to Guillaume Marie Anne Brune, 1st Count Brune (1763–1815). In 1808, he became a genealogist. His genealogical practice was called, "Bureau général de la Noblesse de France" (General Bureau of French Nobility). By 1820, his sold his practice to Jean-Baptiste-Pierre Jullien de Courcelles (1759-1834).

Death and legacy
He died in 1842 in Paris. His son went on to serve in the French Foreign Legion.

Bibliography

 ( 6 volumes 4to and 23 volumes 8vo 1818–1820)

References

1773 births
1842 deaths
People from Langres
Burials at Montparnasse Cemetery
French genealogists
French archivists
French male non-fiction writers